Magyar Demokrata (Hungarian: Hungarian Democrat) is a weekly political magazine published in Budapest, Hungary. It has been in circulation since 1997.

History and profile
Magyar Demokrata was launched in 1997. It is published by artamondo kft on a weekly basis and has its headquarters in Budapest. The magazine has a right wing conservative political leaning and is run by András Bencsik who is its editor. 

The weekly is described by Krisztián Ungváry as a far-right publication and by János Salamon as a neo-Nazi or neo-Arrow Cross magazine. The magazine is also regarded as part of conservative media which appeared in the country in 2010.

Magyar Demokrata, a social-criticism and cultural magazine, features anti-Israel, anti-Semitic and pro-Nazi articles, according to the Heinrich Böll Stiftung and the United States Department of State. However, the weekly claims that anti-Semitism does not exist in Hungary and that it is “a political weapon used by liberals and leftists."

Péter Csermely is one of the former editors of Magyar Demokrata.

In 2016 Magyar Demokrata sold 19,000 copies.

See also
 List of magazines in Hungary

References

External links

 

1997 establishments in Hungary
Conservative magazines
Conservatism in Hungary
Cultural magazines
Hungarian-language magazines
Magazines established in 1997
Magazines published in Budapest
Political magazines published in Hungary
Weekly magazines published in Hungary